Toi, le venin (aka: Blonde in a White Car; US title: Nude in a White Car; UK title: Night Is Not for Sleep) is a 1958 French mystery drama film directed and written by Robert Hossein, based on the novel C'est toi le venin... by Frédéric Dard. The music score was by André Hossein. The film tells the story of a young man who has affairs with two sisters.

Cast
Robert Hossein as Pierre Menda
Marina Vlady as Eva Lecain
Odile Versois as Hélène Lecain
Héléna Manson as Amélie
Henri Crémieux as Le docteur
Pascal Mazzotti as L'homme de la discothèque
Henri Arius as Titin
Charles Blavette as L'inspecteur de police
Lucien Callamand as Julien, le jardinier

External links

Toi, le venin at filmsdefrance.com

1958 films
1958 crime drama films
French black-and-white films
Films based on French novels
Films directed by Robert Hossein
Films about sisters
French crime drama films
Italian crime drama films
1950s French-language films
1950s French films
1950s Italian films